This is a list of Mexican football transfers in the Mexican Primera Division during the winter 2011 transfer window, grouped by club. The 2011 winter transfer window for Mexican football opened on December 1 and closed at 23:00 on December 21, 2011 for the national market and on December 31, 2011 for the international one. Football has been played professionally in Mexico since the early 1900s. Since 1996, the country has played two split seasons instead of a traditional long season. There are two separate playoff and league divisions. After many years of calling the regular seasons as "Verano" (Summer) and "Invierno" (Winter); the Primera División de México (Mexican First League Division) have changed the names of the competition, and has opted for "Apertura" (opening) and "Clausura" (closing) events. The Apertura division begins in the middle of Mexico's summer and ends before the official start of winter. The Clausura division begins during the New Year, and concludes in the spring season.

América

In

Out

Atlante

In

Out

Atlas

In

Out

Cruz Azul

In

Out

Estudiantes Tecos

In

Out

Guadalajara

In

Out

Jaguares

In

Out

Monterrey

In

Out

Morelia

In

Out

Pachuca

In

Out

Puebla

In

Out

Querétaro

In

Out

San Luis

In

Out

Santos Laguna

In

Out

Tijuana

In

Out

Toluca

In

Out

UANL

In

Out

UNAM

In

Out

References

2011–12 in Mexican football
Lists of Mexican football transfers
Mexico